Pumphouse may refer to:

Pumping station
Pumping station
Cobblestone Railroad Pumphouse Ontario County, New York
Polsterberg Pumphouse Upper Harz in central Germany
New Pump-House, the Byrd Park Pump House, Richmond Virginia

Theatres and arts venues
The Pumphouse Aldeburgh Music
The Pumphouse, List of historic places in Calgary venue of Loose Moose Theatre
The PumpHouse Theatre, Takapuna Lake Pupuke
Pumphouse Educational Museum Lavender Pond park Rotherhithe, London

Geography
Pumphouse Point Tasmania Lake St Clair (Tasmania)
Pumphouse Lake Three Lakes Valley on Signy Island
The Pumphouse white water course of Ottawa River Runners

Art and entertainment
South of the Pumphouse, 2006 novella by rock musician Les Claypool
Pumphouse (Tokyo Blade album)